Ilex maclurei is a species of plant in the family Aquifoliaceae. It is endemic to Guangdong Province in China.

References

maclurei
Endemic flora of China
Flora of Guangdong
Critically endangered flora of Asia
Taxonomy articles created by Polbot
Taxa named by Elmer Drew Merrill